Japan competed at the 1980 Winter Olympics in Lake Placid, United States. The Team Consists of 50 athletes 46 were men and 4 were women.

Medalists

Alpine skiing

Men

Biathlon

Men

Men's 4 x 7.5 km relay

 1 A penalty loop of 150 metres had to be skied per missed target.
 2 One minute added per close miss (a hit in the outer ring), two minutes added per complete miss.

Bobsleigh

Cross-country skiing

Men

Figure skating

Men

Women

Ice hockey

First Round - Red Division

Luge

Men

(Men's) Doubles

Nordic combined 

Events:
 normal hill ski jumping 
 15 km cross-country skiing

Ski jumping

Speed skating

Men

Women

References
Official Olympic Reports
International Olympic Committee results database
Japan Olympic Committee database
 Olympic Winter Games 1980, full results by sports-reference.com

Nations at the 1980 Winter Olympics
1980
Winter Olympics